Bukowiec  (formerly German Bauchwitz) is a village in the administrative district of Gmina Międzyrzecz, within Międzyrzecz County, Lubusz Voivodeship, in western Poland.

The village has a population of 835 (population in 2008).

Sports
 KS Błękitni Bukowiec – men's football club (Polish league level 8)

References

Bukowiec